Boila was a title worn by some of the Bulgar and Göktürk aristocrats (mostly of regional governors and noble warriors) in the First Bulgarian Empire (681-1018) and Second Turkic Khaganate (682-744). For the linguists, the title "Boila" is the predecessor or an old form of the title "Bolyar". The Boil(a)s were two types: internal ("great") and external ("small"). The internal Boil(a)s were governors of the Comitates (administrative regions). Most of the popular linguists believe that "Boila" has Old Turkic origin and the meaning of the word can be translated as "noble".

See also 
 Ichirgu-boila
 Bolyar

References 

Bulgarian noble titles
Bulgar language
First Bulgarian Empire
Titles of the Göktürks